Sclater's monal (Lophophorus sclateri) also known as the crestless monal is a Himalayan pheasant. The name commemorates the British zoologist Philip Lutley Sclater.

Taxonomy
Sclater's monal has three recognized subspecies:
 L. s. arunachalensis (Kumar & Singh, 2004)
 L. s. orientalis (Davison G.W.H., 1974)
 L. s. sclateri (Jerdon, 1870)

Description
As with other monals, the male is a colourful bird. It has a highly iridescent purplish-green upperparts plumage, short and curly metallic green crown feathers, copper neck, purplish-black throat, white back, blue orbital skin, yellowish-orange bill and brown iris. In the nominate subspecies, the tail is white with a broad chestnut band, while the tail is entirely white in L. s. arunachalensis from western Arunachal Pradesh in India. The crestless female is mostly a dark brown bird with a white throat and tail-tip, dull bluish orbital skin and a pale yellow bill.

Distribution and habitat

Behaviour
The diet of the Sclater's monal, like that of other members of the genus Lophophorus, probably consists mainly of tubers, roots, bulbs, arthropods, rodents, seeds and flowers. The female usually lays between three and five eggs. It is not known if the male participates in nest defense, but it is likely.

Conservation
Due to ongoing habitat loss, small population size, limited range and overhunting in some areas for food and its feathers, Sclater's monal is evaluated as Vulnerable on IUCN Red List of Threatened Species. It is listed on Appendix I of CITES.

References

External links 

 ARKive - images and movies of the Sclater's Monal (Lophophorus sclateri)
 BirdLife Species Factsheet

Sclater's monal
Birds of Northeast India
Birds of Myanmar
Birds of Tibet
Birds of Yunnan
Sclater's monal